The Calgary Roughnecks are a lacrosse team based in Calgary playing in the National Lacrosse League (NLL). The 2011 season was the 10th in franchise history. 

Despite a fairly successful 10-6 2010 season, the Roughnecks made a number of major roster changes before the 2011 season. In August 2010, the Roughnecks traded superstar forward Josh Sanderson and a draft pick to the Boston Blazers for Darryl Veltman, Jon Harnett, Kyle Ross, and a draft pick. They also traded defender Jeff Moleski to the Washington Stealth. In October, longtime captain Tracey Kelusky was traded to the Buffalo Bandits for a first-round draft pick.

Because of these changes, the Roughnecks were picked by some experts to finish out of the playoffs. But after a 5-3 start to the season, the Roughnecks won six straight, including wins over the defending champion Stealth as well as the Toronto Rock, who were first in the east at the time. The Roughnecks finished the season with the best record in the league at 11-5.

Regular season

Conference standings

Game log
Reference:

Playoffs

Game log
Reference:

Roster

See also
2011 NLL season

References

Calgary
Calgary Roughnecks seasons